The 1978 Sikh-Nirankari clash occurred between the Sant Nirankari Mission and traditional Sikhs on 13 April 1978 at Amritsar, Punjab, India. Sixteen people—thirteen traditional Sikhs and three Nirankari followers—were killed in the ensuing violence, occurring when some Akhand Kirtani Jatha and Damdami Taksal members led by Fauja Singh protested against and tried to stop a convention of Sant Nirankari Mission followers. This incident is considered to be a starting point in the events leading to Operation Blue Star and the 1980s insurgency in Punjab.

Background
The Sant Nirankari Mission splintered from the Nirankari sect in the 20th century. Nirankari, a movement within Sikhism, started in the mid-19th century. Their belief in a living guru as opposed to the scriptural guru Guru Granth Sahib, developing over the decades especially in one branch, resulted in their difference with traditional Sikhs, though they were tolerated. A Nirankari hymn-singer, Boota Singh, had been removed from his paid duties due to "personal lapses" considered incongruous in a missionary organization, and in 1929 tried and failed to set up a rival organization in Peshawar, nominating his devotee Avtar Singh, a bakery shop owner, as his successor in 1943. Without having established any significant religious base, Avtar Singh moved to Delhi after partition, getting his group registered as the "Sant Nirankaris" in 1948, which were "much different" from the successors of the original Nirankari movement they splintered from.
 
His son Gurbachan Singh succeeded him in 1963, and tensions with the Sikhs escalated as he subsequently proclaimed himself as a godman and incarnation of Guru Nanak, styling himself as bājjāṅwālā (Punjabi for "master of the hawk") an epithet of Guru Gobind Singh, using the names of the Sikh Gurus for his servants, and coming out with publications like the Avtar Bani, which made derogatory references to the Guru Granth Sahib of the Sikhs; a story in the Yug Purush narrated that, unlike the prophets of the world's major religions, refused to go back to earth to "spread God’s message", except for Avtar Singh, who decided to do so "only after God agreed that anyone blessed by him would go to heaven irrespective of worldly deeds". By the 1970s, Gurbachan Singh had begun to put himself on par with the Guru Granth Sahib,  Sacrilegious versions of Sikh rituals, including administering to his sat sitāre, or seven stars, his version of the Panj Piare of Guru Gobind Singh, "charan amrit", the water used to wash his feet, in place of the amrit, or holy water mixed with sugar by a steel blade, as dictated by Guru Gobind Singh for the Amrit Sanchar.

Clashes between the Sikhs and the Sant Nirankaris took place beginning in the early 1950s, and tensions simmered through the 1960s, during which the Damdami Taksal came to the forefront to counter Sant Nirankari influence, as well as the Akhand Kirtani Jatha at many places in Punjab. The skirmishes were attributed in significant part to political machinations to maintain a rift between the Akalis and the Damdami Taksal, using the willing Sant Nirankaris to do so; Bhindranwale was being harassed and provoked by senior Sant Nirankari officials in the Punjab administration.

The Akalis claimed that the Sant Nirankaris were supported by the Congress to divide and undermine the Sikh community, while many Sikhs suspected that the Nirankaris were aided and abetted by the central government and the urban Hindu elite in Punjab, who were the base of the Jan Sangh, the Akali Dal's coalition partner, and from whom the Sant Nirankaris received donations from, and hence why the Akalis had permitted the convention. This reported continuous support of the organization by the central government was also evidenced by the fact that, during a very short span, the Sant Nirankaris established 354 branches: 27 abroad and the rest in India, with large amounts of property. The organization created a para-military branch called the Seva Dal, with a membership of over 7,000, headed by a commander, called a mukhya shishak. The Akali Dal's Janata allies warned the Akalis not to intervene in the growing tensions on the pretext of "religious freedom", against the wishes of a large section of the Sikh community. Gurbachan Singh had met prime minister Morarji Desai who gave him assurances; major Sikh leaders, including Jagdev Singh Talwandi and Gurcharan Singh Tohra, responded by telling the press and government not to meddle in the "internal affairs" of the Sikhs by commenting on hukamnamas.

Incident
On 13 April 1978, the day to celebrate the birth of Khalsa, a Sant Nirankari convention headed by their leader Gurbachan Singh was organized in Amritsar, with permission from the Akali state government. While the original Nirankaris, founded in the nineteenth century with a focus on mysticism, coexisted peacefully with mainstream Sikh tradition despite its differences, the practices of the "Sant Nirankaris" subsect were considered heretical by the orthodox Sikhism expounded by Bhindranwale, as they had begun to revere their new founder and successors as gurus and added their own scriptures to the Guru Granth Sahib, the Sikh holy book, with Gurbachan Singh comparing himself to Guru Gobind Singh, saying that he would create the "sat sitārās" (seven stars) to complement the Panj Piare. The government's approval of the new sect's convention in Amritsar in 1978 was particularly galling to orthodox Sikhs, as it fell on 13 April, the founding day of the Khalsa; some felt that the entire Sant Nirankari episode had been provoked on purpose by the central government to destabilize and disunify Sikhs, given its sudden rapid growth in the 1960s, and the unusual composition of converts to the sect, with a preponderance of either gazetted officers and deputy commissioners that could allot land, and the extremely poor as followers they attracted with their wealth, meant that the breakaway sect was being manipulated to undercut the power of Sikhism in the state by the central government at the time, part of what was believed to be constant attempts to "divide and destroy" Sikhism.

From the Golden Temple premises, Bhindranwale delivered a sermon in which he declared that he would not allow this convention. A procession of about two hundred Sikhs led by Bhindranwale and Fauja Singh of the Akhand Kirtani Jatha, which had been founded by Randhir Singh, who had been active in the Ghadr and independence movements and had been imprisoned by the British during that period, left the Golden Temple, heading towards the Nirankari Convention. 

According to eyewitness accounts, the group, mostly men and joined by women who had refused the advice to stay back, headed out of the Darbar Sahib after an ardas and commitment to nonviolence. They were walked by Bhindranwale to the gates, where he was requested to not join, as he would be needed to lead in the event of casualties. The local police assigned to the Sant Nirankaris met the protesters and asked them to wait there, as they would go speak to the Nirankaris about their controversial program. The police would return with armed Nirankaris directly behind them, and in the ensuing melee, the police fired selectively at the Sikh protesters, killing several unarmed men as well as hitting Fauja Singh, who according to KPS Gill (who was not present) attempted to behead Nirankari chief Gurbachan Singh with his sword but was shot dead by Gurbachan's bodyguard. In the ensuing violence, several people were killed: two of Bhindranwale's followers, eleven members of the Akhand Kirtani Jatha and two Nirankaris. According to Kirpal Dhillon, former DGP of Punjab, the reported participation of some senior Punjab government officials in the convention also may have emboldened the Sant Nirankaris to initiate the attack; later police investigations revealed that the attack on the Sikhs was led by a man on horseback with armed attackers, taking place some 250-400 yards away from the venue.
 
Fauja Singh died as he was being rushed to the hospital, and the cremation of Fauja Singh and the 12 other Sikhs occurred in a large ceremony attended by tens of thousands; the photos of his maimed body, with a bullet wound in his left eye, spread along with the news of the death quickly. This event brought Bhindranwale to limelight in the media.

Aftermath
A criminal case was filed against sixty two Nirankaris, charged with the murder of 13 Sikhs, by the Akali-led government in Punjab. The investigation concluded that the attack on the Sikhs was planned by a number of accused, including Gurbachan Singh, all of whom were taken into custody except for Gurbachan Singh himself, who was arrested later in Delhi only after being permitted a personal audience with the Prime Minister Morarji Desai. The Sant Nirankaris had firmly supported Emergency rule, and developed close links with many Congress politicians and bureaucrats, creating a strong foothold in Delhi political circles; this gave rise to opposition from the Akalis and the Damdami Taksal during the same period.

The case was heard in the neighbouring Haryana state, and all the accused were acquitted on grounds of self-defence on 4 January 1980, two days before the Lok Sabha poll. Though the case failed as authorities in Punjab were unable to ensure that the prosecution witness remained uncompromised by interested parties and police in Karnal, the Punjab government Chief Minister Prakash Singh Badal decided not to appeal the decision. The Nirankaris received support from the media, who portrayed the incident as "inter-sect wars" and proof of rising Sikh orthodoxy, and Desai put the entire blame on the Sikhs; orthodox Sikhs saw this as an attempt to manipulate the sect as a way to undercut Sikhism in Punjab. The government's apathy towards apprehending the perpetrators also caused outrage among the Sikhs, with the ruling Akalis accused of shielding them. The death of unarmed protesters had strongly affected the Sikhs, including those formerly apolitical; Bhindranwale increased his rhetoric against the perceived enemies of Sikhs. A letter of authority was issued by Akal Takht to ostracize the Sant Nirankaris. A sentiment was created among some to justify extra judicial killings of the perceived enemies of Sikhism. The chief proponents of this attitude were the Babbar Khalsa founded by the widow, Bibi Amarjit Kaur of the Akhand Kirtani Jatha, whose husband Fauja Singh had been at the head of the march in Amritsar; the Damdami Taksal led by Jarnail Singh Bhindranwale who had also been in Amritsar on the day of the outrage; the Dal Khalsa, formed with the object of demanding a sovereign Sikh state; and the All India Sikh Students Federation.

On 24 April 1980, the Nirankari head, Gurbachan Singh was assassinated. Bhindranwale temporarily took residence in the Akal Takht complex to escape arrest when he was accused of the assassination, though the Babbar Khalsa, who opposed Bhindranwale, claimed responsibility for the killing of Nirankaris. Several of Bhindranwale's associates and relatives were arrested. The FIR named nearly twenty people involved in the murder, claimed to have had ties to Bhindranwale. A member of the Akhand Kirtani Jatha, Ranjit Singh, surrendered and admitted to the assassination three years later, and was sentenced to serve thirteen years at the Tihar Jail in Delhi. Ranjit Singh later became head of Shiromani Gurdwara Parbandhak Committee (SGPC). Ranjit Singh spent 12 years in jail as an under-trial from 1984 to 1996. Several other members of Sant Nirankari Mission were also killed later.

The government and press often referred to Bhindranwale traveling with an armed retinue, though all the weapons carried were licensed, no incidents ever occurred with his escort, and no laws were broken, while on the other hand, the press never protested the fact that Gurbachan Singh himself traveled with armed men, and that in Amritsar on 13 April 1975, they fired upon an unarmed group of about 100 Sikh protestors, killing 13 and injuring another 78. The government dismissed to subsequent Sikh protests as "dogmatism and extremism," disarming the victims instead of the protestors in 1983 by revoking Bhindranwale's licenses. During the Dharam Yudh Morcha launched in August 1982, the government response to peaceful protests involved beatings, torture in police custody, and killing of youth in extrajudicial fake encounters, particularly those in Bhindranwale's group, 113 of whom had been killed by February 1983, 140 by July 1983, and over 200 later that year, with over 2000 returning from police stations severely injured. It was under these circumstances that Bhindranwale instructed his men to defy the license revocation so that, if need arose, they could defend themselves against Nirankaris as well as the police; as police arrests on trumped-up or fabricated charges came to mean torture or death, he advised first to explain their innocence, and if that did not work, to resist. The police crackdown in the state resulted in an average of 50 youths detained and 6 six killed per week, prompting a wider acceptance of Bhindranwale's claim that the government was out to destroy the Sikhs. The People's Union for Civil Liberties, an Indian human rights group, accused the Punjab police of behaving like a "barbarian force." In response, Akali initiatives like Rasta Roko ("Block the Roads") and Kamm Roko (Stop Work) drew massive popular support in Punjab, and seven other states supported Sikh demands for greater autonomy for Punjab and the decentralization of government power.

In 1978, after the incident Akal Takht issued a Hukamnama expelling Nirankaris out of the Sikh community.

Legacy
Gurdwara Shaheed Ganj, Amritsar was raised in the memory of the 13 Sikhs killed in the clash.

Satpal Baghi of Ferozepur in the Indian Express, notes:

Even journalists partial to Congress and Indira Gandhi reported that neither Bhindranwale nor anyone with him had instigated the violence. Tavleen Singh wrote: 

Khushwant Singh wrote:

Bibliography

References

1978 in India
April 1978 events in Asia
History of Sikhism
Insurgency in Punjab
Sectarian violence